James v. United States may refer to the following decisions of the Supreme Court of the United States:

 James v. United States (1906), which held that a justice of the Supreme Court of the District of Columbia was a "judge of the United States" for purposes of the federal statutory scheme for judicial salary, regardless of whether that court was established under Article I or Article III of the U.S. Constitution.
 James v. United States (1961), which held that illegally obtained money was federally taxable income regardless of whether it was repaid as restitution to a victim.
 James v. United States (2007), 550 U.S. ___ (2007), which held that attempted burglary was a predicate felony under the Armed Career Criminal Act.